The Byron Greenough Block or Lower H. H. Hay Block is an historic commercial building at Free and Cross Streets in downtown Portland, Maine.  Built in 1848 and enlarged in 1919 to a design by John Calvin Stevens, it is one of the city's finer surviving Greek Revival commercial buildings.   The block was listed on the National Register of Historic Places in March 1977.

Description and history
The Byron Greenough Block occupies a triangular parcel of land between Federal and Free Streets in downtown Portland.  To its east is a pedestrian area that once carried Middle Street, running southeast from Federal to Free.  The building is a four-story masonry structure, built out of brick with granite trim.  Its principal facade faces the pedestrian area, and is five bays wide, while a single bay marks the triangular point, while the more utilitarian southern facade, facing Free Street, is ten bays wide.  The main facade has modern storefronts on the ground floor, with a framing of granite pilasters and lintels.  Windows on the upper floors have granite sills and lintels, and there are a series of brick stringcourses (part of the original building cornice) between the third and fourth floors.  The current cornice has brick dentil relief and a projecting wooden overhang.

The block was built in 1848 by Byron Greenough, who made his wealth in hatting and clothier, and ran his business here until 1856.  The building notably escaped Portland's 1866 fire, and is consequently one of its few surviving Greek Revival commercial buildings.  For many years its retail space on the ground floor housed the H.H. Hay drugstore.  The architecture firm Stevens and Stevens designed and added the fourth floor.

See also
National Register of Historic Places listings in Portland, Maine

References

Commercial buildings completed in 1848
Commercial buildings on the National Register of Historic Places in Maine
Commercial buildings in Portland, Maine
Greek Revival architecture in Maine
National Register of Historic Places in Portland, Maine